Coatréven is a commune in the Côtes-d'Armor department of Brittany in northwestern France.

Toponymy
The name Coatréven is typically Breton, "koad" meaning "wood" and "Raven" from the name of an Armorican saint of the 4th century or "tréven" could come from the Old Breton "treb" meaning "village".

Population

Inhabitants of Coatréven are called Coatrévenais in French.

See also
Communes of the Côtes-d'Armor department

References

External links

Official website 

Communes of Côtes-d'Armor